Akbarbhai Dalumiya Chavda (born 10 April 1916, date of death unknown) was an Indian politician. He was elected to the Lok Sabha, the lower house of the Parliament of India from Banaskantha, Gujarat. Chavda is deceased.

References

External links
Official biographical sketch in Parliament of India website

1916 births
Year of death missing
India MPs 1952–1957
India MPs 1957–1962
Indian National Congress politicians
Indian National Congress politicians from Gujarat
Lok Sabha members from Gujarat